Ranunculus bullatus, commonly known as autumn buttercup,  is a perennial member of the buttercup family Ranunculaceae, native to Europe and north Africa, including most Mediterranean islands.

Description

Its leaves, which only grow at the base of the stem, are 2–6 cm long, oval, and have broad rounded teeth. Each plant has 1 or 2 flowers which are yellow, scented and about 25mm in diameter. Each has 5-12 petals which are slightly irregular. It flowers from October to December, often covering large areas of ground.

Distribution and habitat
Grows throughout the Mediterranean region, including north Africa, in rocky places, olive groves and dry fields, from sea-level up to 900m.

Etymology
In Latin Rānunculus means "little frog", from rāna "frog", and bullatus means "inflated".

Subspecies
There are three subspecies, Ranunculus bullatus subsp. bullatus (L.) which grows in the Iberian Peninsula, France and Italy; Ranunculus bullatus subsp. cytheraeus (Halácsy) which grows in the eastern Mediterranean including Libya; and Ranunculus bullatus subsp. supranudus (Jordan & Fourr.)
 which grows in Morocco, Algeria and Tunisia.

References

bullatus
Flora of Europe
Flora of Greece
Flora of Italy
Flora of Portugal
Flora of Spain
Flora of North Africa
Taxa named by Carl Linnaeus